Chiara Galiazzo (born 12 August 1986) is an Italian singer. She rose to fame in 2012, after winning the sixth season of the Italian talent show X Factor. Her debut single, titled "Due respiri" and co-written by Eros Ramazzotti, was released on 8 December 2012 and debuted atop the Italian Singles Chart. Chiara released her first studio album, Un posto nel mondo, which debuted at number 2 on the Italian Albums Chart, and spawned the singles "Il futuro che sarà", "Mille passi" and "Vieni con me". In November of the same year, Galiazzo featured on Mika's single "Stardust", which became a number-one hit in Italy.

She performed three times at the Sanremo Music Festival in 2013, 2015, and 2017.

Early life
The elder of two sisters, Chiara Galiazzo was born in Padua on 12 August 1986 to Margherita and Francesco Galiazzo.
She spent her childhood in Saonara, in the Province of Padua. After high school, she moved to Milan, where she studied Economics at the Università Cattolica del Sacro Cuore, living with her sister and two friends. She graduated in April 2012, and she subsequently started an internship as a trader assistant in a financial services company.

Despite being interested in music since she was a child, she has never taken singing lessons. 
In 2008 she auditioned for the eighth series of the Italian talent show Amici di Maria De Filippi, but failed to qualify for the competition. Two years later, she entered the music academy Centro Professione Musica in Milan. In 2011, Galiazzo also auditioned for the fifth series of the Italian version of X Factor, but she was eliminated during the pre-selections, before she had the opportunity to perform in front of the four judges.

Music career

2012: X Factor
In May 2012, Galiazzo successfully performed during the pre-selections of the sixth season of the Italian version of X Factor. In June of the same year, she performed Massive Attack's "Teardrop" in front of the four judges. She advanced to the bootcamp, where she gave a rendition of Amy Winehouse's "Back to Black", as part of a group performance together with other contestants. It was later revealed that her category, soloists aged 25 and over, would be mentored by singer-songwriter Morgan. After singing Florence and the Machine's "Shake It Out", she was chosen by Morgan as one of the three finalists of his category.
During the live shows, Galiazzo performed international hits such as Prince's "Purple Rain", Judy Garland's "Over the Rainbow", The Beatles' "I Want to Hold Your Hand", a tango version of Europe's "The Final Countdown", and "I Was Made for Lovin' You" by Kiss. On 29 November 2012, she also performed her eventual winner's single, "Due respiri", penned by Italian singer-songwriter Eros Ramazzotti together with Luca Chiaravalli and Saverio Grandi.

She advanced to the final of the competition without ever being in the bottom two. During the final, which was held in two consecutive nights for the first time in Italy, she also dueted with British singer Mika, singing "Stardust" from his album The Origin of Love. On 7 December 2012, she was announced the winner of the competition. During the final round, she beat the runner-up Ics for 718,658 televotes to 244,564. As a result, she received a recording contract with Sony Music Italy as a prize, with a stated value of €300,000.

Her winner's single, "Due respiri", was released to Italian radio stations and as a digital download on 8 December 2012, together with the singles of the remaining top four contestants. The song debuted at the number one on the Italian Top Digital Download chart of the week ending on 9 December 2012, despite being released only two days earlier.
A digital EP with the same title was also released on the day after the final of the X Factor, also including the studio versions of four covers previously performed during the show. The EP was released as a CD on 11 December 2012.

2013: Sanremo Music Festival and Un posto nel mondo

On 13 December 2012, Fabio Fazio announced that Chiara Galiazzo was chosen as one of the contestants of the 63rd Sanremo Music Festival, competing in the "Big Artists" section with the songs "L'esperienza dell'amore" and "Il futuro che sarà", written by Tiromancino's leader Federico Zampaglione and Baustelle's frontman Francesco Bianconi, respectively. During the first night of the competition, "Il futuro che sarà" was chosen as her entry for the remaining part of the competition, beating "L'esperienza dell'amore" with 60.25% of votes. During the final, held on 16 February 2013, Chiara was eliminated at the end of the first round, finishing eighth in a field of fourteen.

"Il futuro che sarà" was released to Italian radio stations on 13 February 2013 as the lead single from Chiara's debut album, Un posto nel mondo, also including "Due respiri" and "L'esperienza dell'amore". The album, which spent two weeks at number two on the Italian Albums Chart, spawned two additional single—"Mille passi", recorded as a duet with Italian singer Fiorella Mannoia, and "Vieni con me". In order to promote the album, Chiara embarked on the Un posto nel mondo tour, which debuted on 21 May 2013 in Crema, Lombardy.

Starting from April 2013, Chiara appeared in several TV spots for Telecom Italia, as part of the campaign "Comunicare è condividere", while in September of the same year she was chosen as one of the ambassadors for the Expo 2015.
In July 2013, Galiazzo posted a picture on her Facebook account showing her in a recording studio in London with British singer Mika, hinting she was working with him on a collaborative song. The song was later revealed to be a duet version of Mika's "Stardust", which was included on his compilation album Songbook Vol. 1 and released as a single to Italian radio stations on 7 Novembre 2013 and as a digital download on 12 November 2013. The single peaked at number one on the Italian Top Digital Downloads chart for five non-consecutive weeks, and it was certified triple platinum for sales exceeding 90,000 units.

2014–present: Un giorno di sole, Nessun posto è casa mia and new projects
Since early 2014, Chiara started working on her second studio album, together with authors including former La Fame di Camilla's frontman Ermal Meta and X Factor contestant Daniele Magro. Titled Un giorno di sole, the album was released by Sony Music Italy on 7 October 2014. The title-track was released as the set's lead single on 5 September 2014, while "Il rimedio, la vita e la cura" was released on 31 October 2014 as its second single.
A new edition of the album, titled Un giorno di sole straordinario, was released on 12 February 2015. The new version includes the track "Straordinario", selected to compete in the Sanremo Music Festival 2015. "Straordinario" placed fifth in the main competition and became a top-ten hit in Italy. In Autumn 2015, Galiazzo also became a judge on the Italian talent show Ti lascio una canzone, with Lorella Cuccarini, Fabrizio Frizzi and the music composer Massimiliano Pani.

In December 2016, it was announced that Chiara would compete in Sanremo Music Festival 2017, performing the song "Nessun posto è casa mia". The song was included in the album with the same name, produced by Mauro Pagani, which was released on 24 February 2017. The album peaked at number ten and was promoted by the second single "Fermo immagine", written by the same singer together with Edwin Roberts and Stefano Marletta.

On 26 April 2019, after a year of artistic silence, the singer returned to the musical scenes with the single "Pioggia viola", made with the vocal participation of the rapper J-Ax. At the meantime the artist has embarked on a new tour called  Il tour più piccolo del mondo, consisting of only four stages in Italy. On 29 October 2019 the single "Magnifico donare", written by Virginio, was published. It is the soundtrack for the homonymous advertising campaign promoted by Italian Blood Volunteers Association (AVIS), aimed at raising awareness on the importance of blood donation. Then, on 22 November, the single "L'ultima canzone del mondo" entered into radio rotation. The song sees among the authors the signature of the songwriter Mahmood.

Discography

Studio albums

Extended plays

Singles

As lead artist

As featured artist

Other charted songs

Album appearances

Music videos

Awards and nominations

References

External links

 Chiara at Allmusic
 Chiara Discography at Discogs
 Chiara  at Musicbrainz
 

21st-century Italian women singers
21st-century Italian singers
Italian pop singers
The X Factor winners
X Factor (Italian TV series) contestants
Musicians from Padua
Università Cattolica del Sacro Cuore alumni
Living people
1986 births